Nikolai Konstantinovich Kulchitsky (16 January 1856, Kronstadt – 30 January 1925, Oxford) was a Russian anatomist and histologist, the last Minister of Education of the Russian Empire.

Born into an old untitled noble family of Polish origin, he was the second son of Konstantin Petrovich Kulchitsky (b. 1827), a naval officer, and his wife, Elizaveta Prokofyevna Pavlova, daughter of a Colonel in Russian Imperial army. In 1874–1879 he studied at the Medical Faculty of Kharkiv Imperial University. In 1882 he became a doctor of medicine. In 1897 he described the endocrine cells of the small intestine which now bear his name (Kulchitsky cells).

In 1906 Kulchitsky was a member of council of Kharkiv branch of The Union of Russian People. In 1916 he was appointed Minister of Education of the Russian Empire, a post he held until the February Revolution. In 1918, he was arrested by the Bolsheviks, but was soon released, and then went to Kharkiv, then arrived at Sevastopol. In 1921 he emigrated to England. He worked in the Anatomy Department at University College London. He died in 1925 after an accidental fall in the University College.

He is known for discovering the Kulchitsky cells, which are named after him.

Honours

National honours 
 :
  Order of Saint Vladimir, 3rd and 4th class
  Order of Saint Anna, 2nd and 3rd class
  Order of Saint Stanislaus, 1st, 2nd and 3rd class

Foreign honours
 
  Chevalier of the Legion of Honour

References 

Russian histologists
National University of Kharkiv alumni
1856 births
1925 deaths
Privy Councillor (Russian Empire)